Rhytiphora uniformis is a species of beetle in the family Cerambycidae. It was described by Thomas Blackburn in 1901.

References

uniformis
Beetles described in 1901